Stecknitz is a river of Schleswig-Holstein, Germany. It is a tributary of the Trave near Lübeck. For much of its length it forms part of the Elbe-Lübeck Canal.

See also
List of rivers of Schleswig-Holstein

Rivers of Schleswig-Holstein
0Stecknitz
Rivers of Germany